Benjamin Seifert (born 9 January 1982) is a Germany cross-country skier who has competed since 2000. His best World Cup finish was third in a 4 × 10 km relay event in France in 2006 while Seifert's best individual finish was 12th in a 15 km event in Finland the following year.

Cross-country skiing results 
All results are sourced from the International Ski Federation (FIS).

World Cup

Season standings

Team podiums
 1 podium – (1 )

References

External links

Official website 

1982 births
German male cross-country skiers
Living people
21st-century German people